Sami Venkatachalam Chetty (died 17 November 1958) was an Indian politician, businessman and Indian independence activist who served as a member of the Madras Legislative Council and Imperial Legislative Council of India, as well as President of the Madras Corporation. He is largely known for his surprise victory over Assembly Speaker R. K. Shanmukham Chetty in the 1934 elections to the Imperial Legislative Council.

Career 

Chetty joined the Indian National Congress in the early 1920s and was elected to the Madras Legislative Council in the 1926 elections. He served as the leader of the Swaraj Party in the house during the visit of the Simon Commission. In 1925–26, Chetty served as President of the Madras Corporation.

In 1934, Chetty defeated R. K. Shanmukham Chetty in the elections to the Imperial Legislative Council of India. He served as a member of the council before retiring from politics in the late 1930s.

Condolence 
Shri  Venkatachalam  Chetti was an member of  the former  Central  Assembly from the year  1934  to  1938   He was,  before that,  the  Leader of the Opposition on behalf of the  Congress in the   Madras  Legislative  Assembly. He  was  a  very  prominent  member  of the  previous  Assembly  here 1  am  sure  the  House  will  join  with me  in  conveying  our  condolence  to the  bereaved  family  of  Shri  Venkata- chalem  Chetti.

Notes 

1958 deaths
Indian independence activists from Tamil Nadu
Year of birth missing
Members of the Central Legislative Assembly of India

Andhra movement